Idrissa Halidou (born 3 July 1982) is a Nigerien football striker who currently plays for AS GNN.

References

1982 births
Living people
Nigerien footballers
Niger international footballers
ASEC Mimosas players
Stade d'Abidjan players
Séwé Sport de San-Pédro players
Association football forwards
Nigerien expatriate footballers
Expatriate footballers in Ivory Coast
Nigerien expatriate sportspeople in Ivory Coast
2016 African Nations Championship players
Niger A' international footballers
2020 African Nations Championship players